Borovany is a municipality and village in Písek District in the South Bohemian Region of the Czech Republic. It has about 200 inhabitants.

Etymology
The village used to be surrounded by pine forests (in Czech bory), which gave the village its name.

Geography
It lies in the Tábor Uplands. The village is situated on the shore of Velký Borovanský Pond.

History
The first written mention of Borovany is from 1219. The village was part of the Bernartice estate. Two fortresses were built here around 1399. Adam Bechyně of Lažany took control in the mid-15th century and built a third fortress. In 1620, During the Thirty Years' War, all the peasants of Borovany were killed because of their armed resistance. Adam's grandson Oldřich sold Borovany to the Jesuits in 1623. The village was described as abandoned in 1657, but was later repopulated.

Sights
The landmark of Borovany is the Chapel of the Virgin Mary. It was built in the pseudo-Baroque style in the 18th century and rebuilt in the first half of the 19th century.

None of the fortresses survived, the last one was demolished in 1867.

References

External links

Villages in Písek District